Nez Perce County (pron. Nezz Purse) is a county located in the U.S. state of Idaho. As of the 2020 census, the population was 42,090. The county seat is Lewiston. The county is named after the Native American Nez Percé tribe. Nez Perce County is part of the Lewiston, Idaho–WA Metropolitan Statistical Area.

History
Nez Perce County was originally organized in 1861, when the area was part of Washington Territory. It was reorganized in 1864 by the Idaho Territorial Legislature and was later subdivided into new counties. Rapid migration to the Palouse in the 1880s led to the formation of Latah County in 1888. Isolated from its county seat of Wallace in the Silver Valley, the southern portion of Shoshone County was annexed by Nez Perce County in 1904, then became Clearwater County in 1911. Lewis County was also formed from Nez Perce County in 1911.

Geography

Nez Perce County has two rivers, the Clearwater and the Snake, which meet in Lewiston and then flow west. The Clearwater flows from the east and the Snake from the south, creating the state border with Washington (and further upstream, Oregon). The lowest point in the state of Idaho is located on the Snake River in Lewiston in Nez Perce County, where it flows out of Idaho and into Washington.

The northern portion of the county is part of the Palouse, a wide and rolling agricultural region of the middle Columbia basin.

Adjacent counties

Latah County – north
Clearwater County – northeast
Lewis County – east
Idaho County – southeast/Mountain Time Border
Wallowa County, Oregon – southwest
Asotin County, Washington – west
Whitman County, Washington – northwest

Major highways
 US-12
 US-95
 US-195
 SH-3

National protected areas
 Clearwater National Forest (part)
 Nez Perce National Historical Park (part)
 Wallowa–Whitman National Forest (part)

Government and politics
Nez Perce County is currently strongly Republican, though less so than southern Idaho: it is one of only nine counties (out of 44) in Idaho that has failed to vote Republican in every presidential election since 1968, and indeed supported Dukakis and Bill Clinton (by plurality) three times in succession from 1988 to 1996.

In 2004 Republican George W. Bush defeated Democrat John Kerry 62% to 36%. In 2008 Republican John McCain defeated Democrat Barack Obama by a slightly smaller margin of 58.11 percent to 39.97 percent, a result almost exactly replicated by Mitt Romney in 2012. In 2016 Donald Trump increased the Republican majority to 62.2 percent as against Hillary Clinton's 28.1 percent.

Demographics

2000 census
As of the census of 2000, there were 37,410 people, 15,286 households, and 10,149 families living in the county. There were 16,203 housing units at an average density of 19 per square mile (7/km2). The racial makeup of the county was 91.58% White, 0.28% Black or African American, 5.31% Native American, 0.65% Asian, 0.07% Pacific Islander, 0.50% from other races, and 1.60% from two or more races. 1.93% of the population were Hispanic or Latino of any race. 25.1% were of German, 11.3% English, 11.0% American, 8.9% Irish and 5.6% Norwegian ancestry.

There were 15,286 households, out of which 29.00% had children under the age of 18 living with them, 52.80% were married couples living together, 9.30% had a female householder with no husband present, and 33.60% were non-families. 26.70% of all households were made up of individuals, and 11.30% had someone living alone who was 65 years of age or older. The average household size was 2.40 and the average family size was 2.90.

In the county, the population was spread out, with 23.80% under the age of 18, 10.00% from 18 to 24, 26.70% from 25 to 44, 23.00% from 45 to 64, and 16.50% who were 65 years of age or older. The median age was 38 years. For every 100 females, there were 96.70 males. For every 100 females age 18 and over, there were 93.80 males.

The median income for a household in the county was $36,282, and the median income for a family was $44,212. Males had a median income of $34,688 versus $23,014 for females. The per capita income for the county was $18,544. About 8.60% of families and 12.20% of the population were below the poverty line, including 15.40% of those under age 18 and 6.70% of those age 65 or over.

2010 census
As of the 2010 United States Census, there were 39,265 people, 16,241 households, and 10,331 families living in the county. The racial makeup of the county was 90.1% white, 5.6% American Indian, 0.7% Asian, 0.3% black or African American, 0.1% Pacific islander, 0.7% from other races, and 2.5% from two or more races. Those of Hispanic or Latino origin made up 2.8% of the population. In terms of ancestry, 30.6% were German, 14.5% were Irish, 13.5% were English, and 7.7% were American.

Of the 16,241 households, 28.1% had children under the age of 18 living with them, 48.8% were married couples living together, 10.3% had a female householder with no husband present, 36.4% were non-families, and 28.6% of all households were made up of individuals. The average household size was 2.36 and the average family size was 2.88. The median age was 40.8 years.

The median income for a household in the county was $44,395 and the median income for a family was $55,180. Males had a median income of $42,451 versus $31,920 for females. The per capita income for the county was $23,899. About 8.5% of families and 11.6% of the population were below the poverty line, including 16.2% of those under age 18 and 5.9% of those age 65 or over.

Communities

Cities
Culdesac
Lapwai
Lewiston (county seat)
Peck

Census-designated place
Sweetwater

Unincorporated communities
Gifford
Jacques
Lenore
Myrtle
Southwick
Spalding
Waha

See also
List of Idaho counties
National Register of Historic Places listings in Nez Perce County, Idaho

Footnotes

Further reading
 John M. Henderson and William S. Shiach, with Harry B. Averill, An Illustrated History of North Idaho: Embracing Nez Perces, Idaho, Latah, Kootenai and Shoshone Counties, State of Idaho. n.c. [Chicago]: Western Historical Publishing Co., 1903.

 

 
Idaho counties
1864 establishments in Idaho Territory
Lewiston–Clarkston metropolitan area
Populated places established in 1864